Doi Station is the name of multiple train stations in Japan:

 Doi Station (Fukuoka) (土井駅)
 Doi Station (Osaka) (土居駅)
 Doi Station (Hiroshima) (土居駅) - closed